Anserma (Anserna) is an extinct Chocoan language of Colombia.  Dialects included Caramanta and Cartama.

Jolkesky (2016) also notes that there are lexical similarities with the Barbacoan languages due to contact.

References

Choco languages
Languages of Colombia
Extinct languages of South America